Abu Kamal offensive may refer to:
 2016 Abu Kamal offensive
 2017 Abu Kamal offensive

Military operations of the Syrian civil war